Calvin LeBrun (born August 17, 1966), better known as Mister Cee or DJ Mister Cee, is an American DJ, broadcaster, record executive and radio personality on New York's RADIO 103.9. He was the DJ behind rapper Big Daddy Kane's debut in 1988.  He was also associate executive producer for the Notorious B.I.G.'s 1994 debut album, Ready to Die.

Biography 
LeBrun was born in Bedford–Stuyvesant, Brooklyn, New York City. In his high school, he met rapper Big Daddy Kane. After graduation, he worked for several messenger companies, including Airborne Express, until he and Big Daddy Kane released Kane's 1988 debut album, Long Live the Kane.

In the early 1990s, Mister Cee discovered rapper the Notorious B.I.G., otherwise known as Biggie Smalls. Also, Mister Cee helped develop for Tropical Fantasy soda a new flavor, "Island Punch Finisher". And in 2008, the video game Grand Theft Auto IV featured a realistic Mister Cee character on a rap radio station, "102.7, the Beat".

In real life, his sexuality entered public debate after his repeated arrests for soliciting prostitution from transwomen. Challenged by his radio cohost Ebro Darden, he was partly secretive, but denied being gay. The controversy persisted until he acknowledged that while not seeking sex with transwomen, he has sought such oral sex.

Discography 

The Notorious B.I.G. – Ready to Die (1994), associate producer
The Notorious B.I.G. – Best of Biggie Smalls (1995), producer (mixtape)

References

External links 
Mister Cee at Discogs

1966 births
Living people
Record producers from New York (state)
American radio personalities
People from Bedford–Stuyvesant, Brooklyn
Hip hop record producers
The Flip Squad members
LGBT hip hop musicians
LGBT DJs
American LGBT musicians
LGBT people from New York (state)
20th-century American LGBT people
21st-century American LGBT people
Juice Crew members